Sean Carey is an American musician from Eau Claire, Wisconsin, best known as the drummer and supporting vocalist of indie folk band Bon Iver. In August 2010, Carey released his first solo album, All We Grow, which he began working on in 2008 during hiatuses from performing with the band.

Comparisons have been drawn between Carey's harmonies and those of Brian Wilson in his 2004 album Smile. His music has also been likened to that of Sufjan Stevens, Fleet Foxes, Iron & Wine, José González, Steve Reich, and Talk Talk.

Background
Sean Carey grew up in Lake Geneva, Wisconsin. As the child of a singer and a music teacher, Carey has been immersed in music his entire life. He was raised listening to James Taylor, The Beach Boys, and Bruce Hornsby. At the age of ten he learned to play the drums and developed a deep love of jazz percussion after hearing his oldest sister perform in the middle school jazz band.

In 2007, Carey graduated from the University of Wisconsin–Eau Claire with a performance degree in classical percussion. That same year, upon hearing through mutual friends that Justin Vernon was planning on forming a band (Bon Iver), Carey listened to For Emma, Forever Ago on MySpace until he had learned all the songs. Said Carey:

After singing a few songs backstage, Vernon and Carey realized how good their voices sounded together. Vernon asked Carey to play the show with him that night, and officially signed him to the band later that same evening.

Solo career and debut album
Carey's solo career came about semi-accidentally. After each month-long stint of touring with Bon Iver, Carey would return to Eau Claire for three weeks. During his time at home, Carey would record songs and experiment with layering sounds together.

Carey recorded most of the music on All We Grow by himself with few exceptions. Jeremy Boettcher (bass), Nick Ball (guitar), and Bon Iver bandmate Mike Noyce (viola) played a large percentage of the music that Carey could not. Sean's sister Shannon Carey provided background vocals on two tracks, and Aaron Hedenstrom and Chris Thompson provided miscellaneous musical support.

The song "In the Dirt" appears in the last scene of the episode "The Dig" from the Season 7 of the TV series House M.D. and also in the last scene of the episode "What Went Wrong" from season 3 of the TV series The Good Wife.

Carey produced and appears on Owen's ninth album The King of Whys.

Tour
From September 8 to October 3, 2010, S. Carey toured North America with Swedish folk singer Kristian Matsson, otherwise known as The Tallest Man on Earth. During that time, the group performed fourteen times in Vancouver, Seattle, California, Arizona, Texas, Toronto, Montreal, New York City, Pennsylvania, and Washington DC. When asked what it was like touring with Matsson, Carey responded:

S. Carey performed at CMJ 2010, and was considered "the most buzzed-about act of the day." He spent a great deal of the summer of 2011 opening for David Bazan before joining the Bon Iver tour as band director and one of two drummers.

Discography
 All We Grow (2010)
 Hoyas EP (2012)
 Range of Light (2014)
 Supermoon EP (2015)
 Hundred Acres (2018)
 Break Me Open (2022)

References

External links
 Official Bon Iver website

Living people
People from Eau Claire, Wisconsin
Musicians from Wisconsin
American rock drummers
University of Wisconsin–Eau Claire alumni
Grammy Award winners
Bon Iver members
Jagjaguwar artists
Indie folk musicians
Year of birth missing (living people)